X.28 is an ITU-T standard specifying the interface between asynchronous character-mode data terminal equipment (DTE), such as computer terminals, and a Packet Assembler/Disassembler (PAD) that connects the DTE to a packet switched network such as an X.25 network.

External links
X.28 standard at ITU site

ITU-T recommendations
ITU-T X Series Recommendations